A total lunar eclipse took place on Sunday, October 6, 1968, the second of two total eclipses in 1968, the first was on April 13, 1968. The tables below contain detailed predictions and additional information on the Total Lunar Eclipse of October 6, 1968.

Visibility
It was completely visible over Asia, Australia, and North America, seen rising over central Asia, and setting over central North America.

Related lunar eclipses

Lunar year series

Saros series 
It was part of Saros series 136.

Tritos series 
 Preceded: Lunar eclipse of November 7, 1957

 Followed: Lunar eclipse of September 9, 1979

Tzolkinex 
 Preceded: Lunar eclipse of August 26, 1961

 Followed: Lunar eclipse of November 18, 1975

Half-Saros cycle
A lunar eclipse will be preceded and followed by solar eclipses by 9 years and 5.5 days (a half saros). This lunar eclipse is related to two total solar eclipses of Solar Saros 143.

See also
List of lunar eclipses
List of 20th-century lunar eclipses

Notes

External links

1968-10
1968 in science
October 1968 events